The Chicago Film Critics Association Award for Best Screenplay is one of the annual awards given by the Chicago Film Critics Association.

Winners

1990s
 1990: Goodfellas – Nicholas Pileggi and Martin Scorsese
 1993: Schindler's List – Steven Zaillian
 1994: Pulp Fiction – Roger Avary and Quentin Tarantino
 1995: The Usual Suspects – Christopher McQuarrie
 1996: Fargo – Joel Coen and Ethan Coen
 1997: L.A. Confidential – Curtis Hanson and Brian Helgeland
 1998: Shakespeare in Love – Marc Norman and Tom Stoppard
 Bulworth – Warren Beatty and Jeremy Pikser
 Happiness – Todd Solondz
 A Simple Plan – Scott Smith
 The Truman Show – Andrew Niccol
 1999: Being John Malkovich – Charlie Kaufman
 American Beauty – Alan Ball
 Magnolia – Paul Thomas Anderson
 The Sixth Sense – M. Night Shyamalan
 Topsy-Turvy – Mike Leigh

2000s
 2000: Almost Famous – Cameron Crowe State and Main – David Mamet
 Traffic – Stephen Gaghan
 Wonder Boys – Steve Kloves
 You Can Count on Me – Kenneth Lonergan
 2001: Memento – Christopher Nolan A Beautiful Mind – Akiva Goldsman
 Ghost World – Daniel Clowes and Terry Zwigoff
 Gosford Park – Julian Fellowes
 The Royal Tenenbaums – Wes Anderson and Owen Wilson
 2002: Adaptation. – Charlie and Donald Kaufman About a Boy – Peter Hedges, Chris Weitz, and Paul Weitz
 About Schmidt – Alexander Payne and Jim Taylor
 Far from Heaven – Todd Haynes
 Punch-Drunk Love – Paul Thomas Anderson
 2003: Lost in Translation – Sofia Coppola 2004: Sideways – Alexander Payne and Jim Taylor 2005: Crash – Paul Haggis and Bobby Moresco' Brokeback Mountain – Larry McMurtry and Diana Ossana
 Capote – Dan Futterman
 Good Night, and Good Luck. – George Clooney and Grant Heslov
 A History of Violence'' – Josh Olson

References
 
 
 

Screenplay
Screenwriting awards for film